William Howell (9 August 1866 – 11 November 1958) was a Barbadian cricketer. He played in five first-class matches for the Barbados cricket team from 1883 to 1895.

See also
 List of Barbadian representative cricketers

References

External links
 

1866 births
1958 deaths
Barbadian cricketers
Barbados cricketers
People from Saint Michael, Barbados